The 2008 Atlantic Coast Conference baseball tournament was held at the Baseball Grounds of Jacksonville in Jacksonville, Florida, from May 21 through 25.  The #1 seeded University of Miami won the tournament with a perfect 4–0 record, earning the Atlantic Coast Conference's automatic bid to the 2008 NCAA Division I baseball tournament.  It was Miami's first conference championship in baseball after having played as an independent until joining the ACC during the 2004–05 academic year.

2008 was the second year in which the conference used a round robin tournament format, with the team with the best record in each group at the end of the three-game round robin advancing to a one-game championship.

Seeding Procedure
From TheACC.com:
The top two teams from both the Atlantic and Coastal divisions, as determined by conference winning percentage, in addition to the four teams with the next best conference winning percentage, regardless of division, will be selected to participate in the ACC Baseball Championship. The two division champions will automatically be seeded number one and two based on winning percentage in overall conference competition. The remaining teams will be seeded (three through eight) based on winning percentage in overall conference competition without regard to division. All ties will be broken using the tie-breaking provisions .

Boston College, Duke, Maryland and Virginia Tech did not make the tournament.

Tournament

 Florida State and Miami were Regular Season Division Champs.

All-Tournament Team

(*)Denotes Unanimous Selection

See also
College World Series
NCAA Division I Baseball Championship

References

TheACC.com 2008 Baseball Championship Info

Tournament
Atlantic Coast Conference baseball tournament
Atlantic Coast Conference baseball tournament
Atlantic Coast Conference baseball tournament
21st century in Jacksonville, Florida
Baseball competitions in Jacksonville, Florida
College baseball tournaments in Florida